Črešnjevec pri Dragatušu is a small settlement in the hills southeast of Dragatuš in the Municipality of Črnomelj in the White Carniola area of southeastern Slovenia. The area is part of the traditional region of Lower Carniola and is now included in the Southeast Slovenia Statistical Region.

Name
The name of the settlement was changed from Črešnjevec to Črešnjevec pri Dragatušu in 1953.

References

External links
Črešnjevec pri Dragatušu on Geopedia

Populated places in the Municipality of Črnomelj